El Fabricante de estrellas is a 1943 Argentine film directed by Manuel Romero.

Cast

External links
 

1943 films
1940s Spanish-language films
Argentine black-and-white films
Films directed by Manuel Romero
1940s Argentine films